The 2009 Mexican Figure Skating Championships took place between 8 and 15 November 2008 in Cuautitlán Izcalli. Skaters competed in the disciplines of men's singles and ladies' singles on the senior level. The results were used to choose the Mexican teams to the 2009 World Championships and the 2009 Four Continents Championships.

Senior results

Men

Senior ladies

External links
 results

Mexican Figure Skating Championships, 2009
2008 in figure skating
Mexico Figure Skating Championships, 2009
2008 in Mexican sports
Mexican Figure Skating Championships